St Martin's Church is a grade II listed Church of England parish church in Sherwood, Nottingham.

History
It was first opened in 1937 to the design of Edward Heazell in the Byzantine style. The church was consecrated by the Bishop of Southwell Re Revd Henry Mosley on 6 February 1937.

The consecration of the church was overshadowed by the death of the verger and his wife. Mrs Bradley died on Saturday 6 February 1937, and Mr John Bradley died the day afterwards.

Incumbents
Revd Edward Lysons 
Revd William Willatt 1955
Revd Timothy Tyndall 1960
Revd Ian Gatford 1975
Revd Christopher Gale 1984 
Revd Sylvia Griffiths 1999
Revd Bridget Baguley 2017

Organ
A pipe organ was installed in 1937 by Harrison and Harrison. It was originally installed in St. Luke's Church, Chelsea in 1907.

Organists

Kendrick Partington 1947-1950 (later organist of St Peter's Church, Nottingham
Mr. Vivian Grainger 1950-1960
Martin Barrett 2008–2015 (Worship group leader, keyboardist and organist)
Richard Marsden 2015-2021

External links
See St. Martin's Church on Google Street View

Sources
The Buildings of England, Nottinghamshire, Nikolaus Pevsner

References

Churches in Nottingham
Grade II listed churches in Nottinghamshire
Churches completed in 1937
Church of England church buildings in Nottinghamshire